Sithiphol Kunaksorn is a bowling player from Thailand. He has played and won various national and international tournaments and won the Bronze at the 2014 Asian Games in Incheon.

References

Sithiphol Kunaksorn
Asian Games medalists in bowling
Bowlers at the 2006 Asian Games
Bowlers at the 2014 Asian Games
Bowlers at the 2018 Asian Games
Living people
Sithiphol Kunaksorn
Medalists at the 2014 Asian Games
Sithiphol Kunaksorn
Sithiphol Kunaksorn
Southeast Asian Games medalists in bowling
Year of birth missing (living people)
Competitors at the 2017 Southeast Asian Games